Roxanne Varzi (born 1971) is an Iranian-born American cultural anthropologist, filmmaker, sound artist, writer, playwright, and educator. She is a full professor of anthropology and film and media studies at University of California, Irvine (UCI). Varzi is known for her various works in media, including books, film documentaries, sound performances, and theatrical plays.

Early life and education 
Roxanne Varzi was born in 1971 in Iran, to an American mother and an Iranian father. Her family migrated to the United States after the Iranian Revolution in 1979, settling in Grosse Pointe, Michigan.

She moved in 1991 to continue her education at the American University in Cairo in Cairo, Egypt, and graduated in 1993 from American University in Washington D.C.. In 1994, she moved to Tehran and remained there for four years, and returned to the United States to continue her studies.

She was the first recipient of the Fulbright award to Iran since the Iranian Revolution. Varzi completed her PhD in 2002 at Columbia University for anthropology.

Career 
From 2002 to 2004, Varzi was an instructor of anthropology at New York University. Varzi joined the University of California, Irvine in 2005, and she became a full professor of in the Department of Anthropology in 2009.

While at the University of California, Irvine, she has completed many works. Even though many of her works are focused on Iranian culture, she has expanded her work to tackle universal issues concerning war. Due to her Iranian roots, many of her works focus on post-Revolution Iran public culture.

Her first book, Warring Souls: Youth, Media, and Martyrdom in Post-Revolution Iran (2006) focuses heavily on how propaganda and media take a role in shaping the identities of those living in post-Revolution Iran. The author says this that her book focuses on "the intersection of religion, vision, and power, and whether the individual ultimately has the power to turn an image off". Her second work, Plastic Flowers Never Die (2008) which is an experimental documentary on the effects of the war in Iran, and the aftermath of the war. In this documentary, she speaks to mural painters, museum curators, and veterans to get a thorough breakdown of war and how the post-war period has been affected by the war. Plastic Flowers Never Die was selected for 14 film festivals. The Whole World Blind (2011) was her first sound performance. It is said to be experienced while the audience is "blindfolded and wearing headphones". The audience listens to a "narrative loop of a curator describing a slide show of war photography". Her second book, Last Scene Underground: An Ethnographic Novel of Iran (2015) is a fictional story set in Iran's Green Movement about young Iranians learning life lessons "through politics, art, and the meaning of home". Her work, Salton Sublime (2017), is another sound performance focusing on what sublime means in the current state of environmental degradation our world is facing.

Awards 

 Fulbright Award (2000)
 Society for Humanistic Anthropology - Ethnographic Fiction Competition (2007)
 Gold medalist in multicultural fiction for Last Scene Underground, Independent Publisher Book Awards (2016)

Publications

Books

Chapters

Articles

Works 
 Plastic Flowers Never Die (documentary) (2008)
 The Whole World Blind (sound performance) (2011)
 Salton Sublime (sound performance) (2017)
 Splinters of a Careless Alphabet (play) (2019)
 Act One to The End: Ask the Ayatollah (play) (2019)

References

External links 
 
 http://www.socsci.uci.edu/~rvarzi/
 http://www.faculty.uci.edu/profile.cfm?faculty_id=5393

1971 births
Living people
American filmmakers
American women anthropologists
American women writers
Columbia University faculty
American people of Iranian descent
University of California, Irvine faculty
American women academics
21st-century American women